Kaikovu may be:
Sinsauru language (Claassen & McElhanon)
Kesawai language (SIL)